Rommy Diaz Putra (born 22 July 1980 in Batusangkar, West Sumatra) is an Indonesian footballer. He normally plays as a defender and his height is 172 cm. He is a former player for the Indonesia U-23 Team. During his first 3 seasons at Semen Padang, Rommy just sat on the bench. In 2003, his career took off under the direction of his coach, Suhatman Imam, and he was featured in the premier line-up. That confidence was repaid with good performances, and guaranteed a strong defence for Semen Padang.

His performance received special appreciation from Sergei Dubrovin, coach of the national team of Vietnam for the Sea Games XXII. He became the first choice as defence of the ‘Merah Putih’ team. "More his age, he more adult or mature. Without his contribute the became not equal or balance", said Syafrianto Rusli, architect of Semen Padang. Putra said, "First since, I want to choose position as a defensive or back player. I don't know why. But, its like, there are more challenge, for replace defender equal other position".

Although he has become a stable footballer, he is considering retirement, and he believes that his injury is telling him to retire. "I ever knee's injured during 4 months. Some make me thinking opportunity to retire from football. His luck, after medicine to anywhere, the injured can be recovered", said Ira Octaviani's husband.

National team career
 2002: futsal national team
 2003: SEA Games Vietnam

References

Indonesian footballers
PSMS Medan players
1980 births
Living people
Association football defenders
People from Tanah Datar Regency
Sportspeople from West Sumatra